Guinea-Bissau competed in the Olympic Games for the first time at the 1996 Summer Olympics in Atlanta, United States.

Results by event

Athletics

Men 

Track and road events

Wrestling 

Freestyle

References
Official Olympic Reports

Summer Olympics
Nations at the 1996 Summer Olympics
1996